Haliplus angusi is a species of Haliplidae in the genus Haliplus.

References

Haliplidae
Beetles described in 1991